N. T. Rama Rao (28 May 1923 – 18 January 1996), commonly known by his initials NTR, was an Indian actor, screenwriter, director and producer who worked primarily in Telugu cinema. Through his over four-decade long career of almost 300 films, he was considered one of the most pivotal figures of the Telugu industry. After his debut in Mana Desam (1949) and his first lead role in Palletoori Pilla (1950), Rama Rao's performance in the fantasy film Pathala Bhairavi (1951) made him famous. His other films with Vijaya Vauhini Studios, Malliswari (1951) and Pelli Chesi Choodu (1952), were also successful, causing him to become the industry's "top star" according to Ashish Rajadhyaksha and Paul Willemen in the book Encyclopedia of Indian Cinema. He also took his first steps into film production by forming the National Art Theatre production studio in 1953.

Through the late 1950s and 1960s, Rama Rao became well known for his work in mythological films. Notably Bandipotu and Niluvudhopidi. After a poorly-received cameo as Krishna in Sonta Ooru (1956), his portrayal of the god in the epic Mayabazar (1957) won him praise. Rama Rao would go on to play Krishna in sixteen other films, with the role quickly becoming iconic for him. In 1958's Bhookailas, he played the demon king Ravana to critical acclaim, which was an unprecedented turn for an actor who had mostly played heroic roles up to that point. In the wake of its success, Rama Rao reprised the role in his successful directorial debut Seeta Rama Kalyanam (1961). By then, his fans considered him a "demigod" due to his performance as Venkateswara in Sri Venkateswara Mahatyam the year before, to the point that pilgrims would visit Rama Rao's house after going to the deity's temple.

Later in his career, Rama Rao shifted his focus to social melodramas and vigilante films. He also delved deeper into filmmaking, forming Ramakrishna Cine Studios in 1976. The following year, Rama Rao wrote, directed and produced the first film under this banner, Daana Veera Soora Karna. With his adoption of a new, youthful image in his other roles that year also becoming popular with audiences, 1977 has been considered Rama Rao's annus mirabilis.

He would continue starring in vigilante films, often with themes of rebellion against a corrupt system and dual "old-young" hero roles, which continued to be box-office hits despite being considered cheesy and over-the-top by critics. After Rama Rao entered politics in 1982, he started to withdraw from the film industry. Having become Chief Minister of Andhra Pradesh in 1983, he took a six-year break during his first two terms, with his last role beforehand being 17th century fortune teller Potuluri Veerabrahmam in Srimadvirat Veerabrahmendra Swami Charitra (1984). Near the end of his second term, he controversially re-entered cinema by starting production of his next film Brahmarshi Viswamitra (1991) while still in office. Both this film and his following production Samrat Ashoka (1992) failed to reinvigorate his career. Rama Rao's final two films were released the year after, with Major Chandrakanth becoming a "sensational hit" and Srinatha Kavi Sarvabhowmudu flopping at the box office despite being critically praised.

On-screen roles 

All films are in Telugu, unless otherwise noted.

Off-screen roles

Production credits

Notes

References

Bibliography 

 
 
 
 
 
 
 

Indian filmographies
Male actor filmographies